3 colpi di Winchester per Ringo (Three Graves for a Winchester or Three Bullets for Ringo) is a 1966 Italian Western film directed by Emimmo Salvi and shot in Totalscope.  It is the first and only film collaboration between Mickey Hargitay and Gordon Mitchell.  The two friends appeared together in Mae West's 1950s  Las Vegas stage show, then traveled to Italy where they made sword and sandal films.  It was the first Western for Gordon Mitchell.

Plot
Ringo, Frank and their sidekick Tom are hired by Walton, a gunrunner to rescue Jane Walcom, his daughter from a band of Mexicans he did business with.  Shooting their way through the mob, the rescue is a success, but Ringo and Frank's friendship is ruined when Jane marries Ringo.

The two do not meet again until after the end of the American Civil War. Ringo has become the town sheriff and the father of a son. Frank returns to his hometown as a leader of a band of Confederate Guerrillas and outlaws. Frank obtains both wealth and revenge by hiring himself out to town boss Daniels who pays Frank to terrorize the town in order to obtain ranches from reluctant owners as well as murdering Ringo's mother and kidnapping Jane.

Cast 
 Mickey Hargitay as Ringo Carson
 Gordon Mitchell as Frank Sanders
 Milla Sannoner as Jane Carson née Walcom
 Spartaco Conversi as Tom (credited as Spean Convery)
 Ivano Staccioli as Daniels (credited as John Heston)
 Amedeo Trilli as Walcom (credited as Mike Moore)
  as Mother Carson

Production 
Filming was in areas near Almeria, Spain and in Rome.

References

External links
 

1966 films
1960s Italian-language films
Spaghetti Western films
1966 Western (genre) films
1960s Italian films